The Sony α6000 (model ILCE-6000) is a digital camera announced 12 February 2014. It is a mirrorless interchangeable lens camera (MILC), which has a smaller body form factor than a traditional DSLR while retaining the sensor size and features of an APS-C-sized model. It is targeted at professionals, experienced users, and enthusiasts. It replaced the NEX-6 and NEX-7. Review websites note that although the α6000 uses a 24 MP sensor like the Sony NEX-7, the Sony α6000 can also be seen as more of a replacement of the Sony NEX-6. In the Firmware version 1.10, an android subsystem was added. The sub system was used to run Sony's apps.

At the time of its release, the Sony α6000 was advertised featuring the "world's fastest autofocus" with lag of 0.06 second and 11 fps continuous shooting with tracking AF. Its MSRP is $700 with a 16–50 mm power-zoom kit lens f/3.5-5.6.

Despite the announcement of an updated model in February 2016, the α6300, Sony has said they will continue production of the α6000.

Compared to its predecessor, Sony NEX-6 
The Sony α6000 was released one and a half year later, and has a slightly different shaped body than the NEX-6. The α6000's body silhouette is almost like a perfect rectangle. They use the same sensor size, but the α6000 has a 24 megapixel resolution, which is a 50% higher resolution, than the 16 MP NEX-6. The alpha model has an extra physical control dial, compared to the NEX model. The newer model has a slightly faster burst rate (11 fps vs 10 fps) and has almost twice as many autofocus points (179 vs 99), which makes it a lot more capable of sports photography. The α6000 also offers Near-field communication and smartphone remote control over Wi-Fi, which the NEX cannot do. The SD card slot supports UHS-I in the α6000 whereas the NEX-6 doesn't support any UHS standards. But there is one aspect which is a bit indistinctive and better in the older model: The NEX-6 has a 63% higher resolution electronic viewfinder than the α6000 (2,359,000 dots vs 1,440,000 dots).

Compared to its other predecessor, Sony NEX-7 
The NEX-7 was introduced in 2011 and has a more rounded body, than the 3 years newer α6000. They use the same, 24 MP image sensor, but the noise performance is better in the newer model, thanks to the better processor. It also offers a higher maximum sensitivity (25,600 vs 16,600). The biggest difference is the autofocus: The NEX-7 only has 25 focus points, the α6000 has 179, so it's a lot more accurate and also faster. The burst rate is the same as the NEX-6 in the NEX-7, (10 fps), the α6000 can shoot a tiny bit faster continuously (11 fps). Similarly to the NEX-6, there is no NFC, Wi-Fi remote control or UHS memory card support in the NEX-7, but the α6000 has these features. The Alpha model is 56g lighter than the NEX. However, there is also one aspect, which the NEX-7 is clearly better, than its successor, and this is the fact, it has a microphone jack input, which is present in the NEX, but the α6000 lacks it for some reason. In terms of buttons, they have a different layout, but there are the same dials and buttons on the two cameras.

Popularity
The Sony α6000 proved to be an extremely popular camera. By early 2016, it was reported to be the best-selling interchangeable-lens camera in the over-US$600 price range as well as the best-selling mirrorless camera of all time.

Firmware updates
Firmware version 1.10, released on 30 October 2014, added faster start up time and support for the "Smart Remote Control" Play Memories application.

Firmware version 1.20, released on 26 March 2015, improved images captured on new lenses and added a few minor enhancements.

Firmware version 1.21, released on 6 April 2015, fixed an error in version 1.20 and improved lens performance.

Firmware version 2.00, released on 16 June 2015, enabled video capture with the XAVC S codec to support high Bit Rates.

Firmware version 3.10, released on 17 March 2016, optimized lens performance (applied to the lenses releasing after 2016 March).

Firmware version 3.20, released on 26 July 2016, optimized lens performance (SEL-70200GM).

Firmware version 3.21, released on 19 March 2019, improved stability of the AF operation.

Mobile phone application update 2019
There is an application (Image Edge Mobile) which allows a user to control the Sony A6000-A6500 camera. The application also allows a user to transfer photos over wireless to the user's mobile phone.

See also
List of Sony E-mount cameras
Sony α6300
Sony α6500
Sony α7

References

α6000
Live-preview digital cameras
Cameras introduced in 2014